The Indiana District is one of the 35 districts of the Lutheran Church–Missouri Synod (LCMS), encompassing the state of Indiana and most of western Kentucky; the remainder of Kentucky is divided between the Mid-South District and the Ohio District. However, one Kentucky congregation and ten Indiana congregations are in the non-geographic English District, and two congregations in Lake County are in the SELC District. The Indiana District is home to Concordia Theological Seminary in Fort Wayne, Indiana, and includes approximately 236 congregations and missions, subdivided into 24 circuits, as well as 53 preschools, 49 elementary schools, and 3 high schools. Baptized membership in district congregations is approximately 102,000.

The Indiana District was formed in 1963 when the Central District of the LCMS was divided, also creating the Ohio District. District offices are located in Fort Wayne. Delegates from each congregation meet in convention every three years to elect the district president, vice presidents, circuit counselors, a board of directors, and other officers. D. Richard Stuckwisch was elected at the district convention on July 23–24, 2022, and was installed on September 6.

Presidents
Edgar C. Rakow, 1963–1970
Elwood H. Zimmermann, 1970–1988
Reuben Garber, 1988–1991
Timothy E. Sims, 1991–2003
Daniel P. May, 2003–2018
Daniel J. Brege, 2018–2022
D. Richard Stuckwisch, 2022–present

Churches on the National Register of Historic Places

References

Further reading
Burger, Mildred L., A Short History of the Lutheran Church—Missouri Synod in Fort Wayne, Indiana (Fort Wayne: Fort Wayne Public Library, 1967)

External links
Indiana District web site
LCMS Congregation Directory
Indiana District Photographs

Lutheran Church–Missouri Synod districts
Lutheranism in Indiana
Lutheranism in Kentucky
Christian organizations established in 1963